The women's 58 kg competition of the weightlifting events at the 2011 Pan American Games in Guadalajara, Mexico, was held on October 24 at the Weightlifting Forum.  The defending champion was Alexandra Escobar from Ecuador.

Each lifter performed in both the snatch and clean and jerk lifts, with the final score being the sum of the lifter's best result in each. The athlete received three attempts in each of the two lifts; the score for the lift was the heaviest weight successfully lifted. This weightlifting event was the third lightest women's event at the weightlifting competition, limiting competitors to a maximum of 58 kilograms of body mass.

Schedule
All times are Central Standard Time (UTC-6).

Results
5 athletes from 4 countries took part.
PR – Pan American Games record

New records
The following records were established and improved upon during the competition.

References

External links
Weightlifting schedule

Weightlifting at the 2011 Pan American Games
Pan
Wei